A national forest is a forest owned by the French state. This status originates with the Edict of Moulins of 1566. French national forests are managed by the National Board of Forestry (NFB) under the national forestry law, the successor of ordinances and regulations that have taken place since the time of Charlemagne "at the discretion of political, economic and demographic context of France, making the first state-owned natural forest areas whose management is rigorously controlled".

Legal status 
National forests have existed in some form since ancient times: in fact state ownership is a legal system distinct from inheritance and private property that dates back to the Edict of Moulins (1566).

Thus, a number of royal forests are the "property" of the state, which has delegated the management of the Ministry of Agriculture who has himself told NFB and sometimes about national parks.  or the abusus, the public domain is inalienable.

Disposition of National Forests

Before 2006 
Prior to 2006, Article L. 62 in French national code stated:

This article therefore specified that forests can be sold by decree or order in France) ("ordinary form"), of woods of less than 150 hectare, at least  from other large forests.

The 2006 reform 
In 2006, an ordonnance which codifies the legislative part of the general code of the property of public persons; former Article L. 62 was renumbered Article L. 3211-5 of the CGPPP. But the renumbering was accompanied by a significant change.

The new Article L. 3211-5 provides:

Management of National Forests 
Under the Forest Code, the National Forests Office (NFB) manages state forests. Management is made under a contract of objectives and performance between the state and the NFB, which organizes details of national forest policy. Following the Grenelle Environment a dual general purpose is to Produce more wood, while better preserving the biodiversity. This sentence does not apply to the management of national forests, but to objective of sable harvesting.

Each forest has a forest management (plan) written for a period of 15–25 years and approved by the Minister of Agriculture. This arrangement establishes guidelines and management plans cuts during the period.

Revenues from state-owned forests are used for operation of the NFB, which manages both profitable forests and unprofitable forests (especially in the mountains or in Provence). The potential benefit of the NFB could return to the state.

Origin and area 
In France there are approximately 1,300 National Forests for a combined forest area of about 1,800,000 hectare.

690,000 hectare were originally royal forests; 340,000 hectare are former abbey forests confiscated by the State during the Revolution; 65,000 hectare are forested dunes under the order of February 5, 1817; 390,000 hectare consists of eroding land acquired under the land restoration mountain; 200,000 hectare acquired from private forests since 1914.

Origin of Royal Forests 
 Royal properties since time immemorial. They are mainly located in the Paris region and in the Pays de la Loire. About {390,000 hectare.
 Contributed to the Crown by Henry IV of France in 1589. Hautes-Pyrénées, Haute-Garonne and Ariege. About 80,000 hectare.
 Ancient sovereign areas that became royal domain (Flanders, Artois, Lorraine, Alsace, Franche-Comte, Corsica). About 210,000 hectare.
 Acquisitions to improve the supply of wooden marine arsenals Lorient and Brest in the 18th century . About 10,000 hectare.

Large National Forests 

 Forêt domaniale d'Orléans (Loiret). 34,700 ha, the largest national forest in France.
 Forêt domaniale de Chaux (Jura). 20,493 ha.
 Forêt domaniale de Fontainebleau (Seine-et-marne). 20,272 ha. 
 Forêt domaniale de Compiègne (Oise). 14,357 ha.
 Forêt domaniale indivise de Haguenau (Bas-Rhin). 13,462 ha, joint ownership between the state and the municipality of Haguenau.
 Forêt domaniale de Retz (Aisne). 13,240 ha.
 Forêt domaniale de la Harth (Haut-Rhin). 13,140 ha.
 Forêt domaniale de l'Aigoual (Gard). 11,460 ha.
 Forêt domaniale de Tronçais (Allier). 10,532 ha.
 Forêt domaniale de Mormal (Nord). 9,140 ha.
 Forêt domaniale de la Grande-Chartreuse (Isère). 8,466 ha.
 Forêt domaniale de Darney (Vosges). 8,010 ha.
 Forêts domaniales de Saint-Gobain et de Coucy-Basse (Aisne). 8,480 ha.
 Forêts domaniales de Chœurs et de Bommiers (Cher et Indre). 6,460 ha.
 Forêt domaniale de l'Estérel (PACA). 6,000 ha.
 Forêt domaniale de Château-Regnault. 5,500 ha.
 Forêt domaniale de Bercé (Sarthe). 5,400 ha.
 Forêt domaniale d'Andaines (Orne). 5,396 ha.
 Forêt domaniale de Chinon (Indre-et-Loire). 5,140 ha.
 Forêt domaniale de Perseigne (Sarthe). 5,110 ha.
 Forêt domaniale de Trois-Fontaines (Marne). 5,070 ha.
 Forêt domaniale de Cîteaux (Côte-d'Or). 3,610 ha.
 Forêt domaniale de Loches (Indre-et-Loire). 3,590 ha.
 Forêt domaniale de Grésigne (Tarn). 3,460 ha.
 Forêt domaniale de Rennes. 2,950 ha.
 Forêt domaniale d'Aïtone (Corse). 1,675 ha. 
 Forêt domaniale de Montmorency.

See also 
 List of types of formally designated forests

References 

France
Forests of France